The Perfect Stranger is a 1984 album featuring the music of Frank Zappa, conducted in part by Pierre Boulez.  It was originally issued on vinyl in 1984 and on CD in 1985 by Angel, and then in remixed and resequenced form on CD by Barking Pumpkin in 1991. Later reissues (of the same master) were by Rykodisc in 1995 and Zappa/Universal in 2012.

Boulez conducted three tracks ("The Perfect Stranger", "Naval Aviation in Art?" and "Dupree's Paradise"), recorded at IRCAM, Paris on January 10 and January 11, 1984, and performed by Boulez's Ensemble InterContemporain. The title track was also commissioned by Boulez, and contains references to Zappa's 1971 film, 200 Motels. The remaining four tracks are credited to 'The Barking Pumpkin Digital Gratification Consort'—in fact, Zappa's Synclavier. "Outside Now Again" is a Synclavier performance based on a transcription of Zappa's guitar solo in the song "Outside Now" from the 1979 Joe's Garage album.

The track Jonestown is a reference to the 1978 Jonestown Massacre, where cult leader Jim Jones drove his followers to collective suicide.

Track listing
All compositions by Frank Zappa.

Different track timings are probably due to mislisting. There are no reports of tracks being longer or shorter on the original vinyl.

Personnel 

 Pierre-Laurent Aimard – Piano
 Guy Arnaud – Clarinet (Bass)
 Lawrence Beauregard – Flute
 Pierre Boulez – Conductor, Direction
 Daniel Ciampolini – Percussion
 Antoine Curé – Trumpet
 Ensemble InterContemporain – Orchestra
 Péter Eötvös – Musical Director
 Jacques Ghestem – Violin
 Don Hunstein – Photography
 Marie-Claire Jamet – Harp
 The London Symphony Orchestra
 John Matousek – Mastering
 Paul Meyer – Clarinet
 Jérôme Naulais – Trombone
 David Ocker – Programming
 Bob Stone – Remixing
 Frank Zappa – Synclavier, Producer, Liner Notes

References

External links
Album information
Release details

1984 albums
Albums produced by Frank Zappa
Angel Records albums
Frank Zappa albums